The following list of  Audi vehicles, including past and present production models, as well as concept vehicles and limited editions. The current era of Audi production dates to 1968, when present-day owner Volkswagen, which had purchased Auto Union from Mercedes Benz in 1965, debuted the first modern Audi-branded vehicles. This revived the Audi nameplate, which was first used in 1910, but was largely supplanted by Auto Union in the 1930s.

Current models

Model chronology
The following are models sorted by year of introduction.

1960s
 Audi 60 (1969–1972)
 Audi 100 (1968–1978)

1970s
 Audi 80 (1972–1978)
 Audi 50 (1974–1978)
 Audi 100 (1969–1976)
 Audi 100 Coupé S (1969–1974)
 Audi 80 (1978–1986)
 Audi 200 (1979–1984)

1980s
 Audi 100 (1982–1990)
 Audi 80 quattro (1980–1987)
 Audi 5+5 (1981–1983)
 Audi 90 (1984–1987)
 Audi Coupé (1980–1988)
 Audi Sport quattro (1983–1984)
 Audi 80 (1986–1991)
 Audi 90 (1986–1991)
 Audi V8 (1988–1995)
 Audi Coupé (1988–1995)

1990s
 Audi 100/A6 (1991–1998)
 Audi 80 (1991–1996)
 Audi Cabriolet (1991–2000)
 Audi A8 (1994–2003)
 Audi A4 (1994–2001)
 Audi A3 (1996–2003)
 Audi A6 (1997–2006)
 Audi Duo (1997)
 Audi TT Coupé (1998–2006)
 Audi TT Roadster (1999–2006)
 Audi A2 (1999–2006)
 Audi 90 (1993)

2000s
 Audi A4 (2001–present)
 Audi A8 (2003–2010)
 Audi A3 (2003–2013)
 Audi A6 (2004–2011)
 Audi A3 Sportback (2005–present)
 Audi Q7 (2005–present)
 Audi A6 allroad quattro (2006–present)
 Audi A4 Cabriolet (2002–2006)
 Audi TT (2006–present)
 Audi A4 (2007–present)
 Audi A5 (2007–present)
 Audi Q5 (2008–present)
 Audi TT 2.0 TDI quattro (2008–present)
 Audi A4 allroad quattro (2009–present)
 Audi R8 (2006–present)
 Audi R8 V10

2010s
 Audi A1 (2010–present)
 Audi A3 (2003–present)
 Audi A5 (2003–present)
 Audi A6 (2011–present)
 Audi A6 allroad quattro (2012–present)
 Audi A7 (2010–present)
 Audi A8 (2010–present)
 Audi Q2 (2017–present)
 Audi Q3 (2011–present)
 Audi Q5 (2008–present)
 Audi Q7 (2005–present)
 Audi Q8 (2008–present)
 Audi R8 (2015–present)
 Audi TT (2017–present)
 Audi e-tron

S and RS models

 Audi S2 Coupé B3 (1990–1995)
 Audi S4 C4 (1991–1995)
 Audi S2 Avant B4 (1992–1995)
 Audi S2 Sedan B4 (1993–1994)
 Audi Avant RS 2 P1 (1993–1994)
 Audi S8 D2 (1994–2003)
 Audi S6 C4 (1994–1997)
 Audi S4 quattro B5 (1997–2002)
 Audi S6 C5 (1999–2004)
 Audi S3 8L (1999–2003)
 Audi RS 4 Avant B6 (2000–2001)
 Audi S4 B6 (2002–2005)
 Audi RS 6 C5 (2002–2004)
 Audi S3 8P (2006–2012)
 Audi RS 4 B7 (2006–2008)
 Audi S4 B7 (2006–2008)
 Audi S8 D3 (2006–2010)
 Audi S5 B8 (2007–2012)
 Audi R8 42 (2007–2015)
 Audi RS 6 C6 (2007–2011)
 Audi TTS (2008–)
 Audi TT RS 8J (2009–2016)
 Audi RS5 8T (2010–2015)
 Audi S8 D4 (2010–2017)
 Audi R8 GT (2010–2013)
 Audi S3 8V (2012–)
 Audi S7 4G (2012–2017)
 Audi S5 B8.5 (2013–2017)
 Audi RS 6 C7 (2013–2018)
 Audi RS7 C7 (2013–)
 Audi S1 8X (2015–)
 Audi R8 4S (2015–)
 Audi TT RS 8S (2016–)
 Audi S5 B9 (2017–)
 Audi RS5 (2017–)
 Audi RS 6 C8 (2019–)
 Audi S8 D5 (2020–)

Electric models

Hybrid electric vehicles includes:
 Audi A1 Sportback Concept
 Audi A4 TDI Concept E

Fully electric vehicles:
 Audi e-tron SUV
 Audi e-tron GT
 Audi e-tron Concept Supercar
 Audi Q2L e-tron SUV (Chinese Market)

Discontinued models

1965–1988

1991–2010

Concept models

1981–2001

2003–2007

2008–2009

2010–2011
{| class="wikitable"   width=60%
|-
!A1 e-tron
!Quattro

Historical models

1910–1928

1928–1940

Racing models

Le Mans prototypes

Grand Touring

Cup

There more new Audi’s over 2015 to 2022

Touring Cars/Silhouettes

Rally and RallyCross

Production model engines
The following tables list current Audi model engine offerings:

See also

List of automobiles
List of Audi engines
List of Audi platforms

References

Audi